Abdul Gafur Bhuiyan is a Bangladesh Nationalist Party politician and the former Member of Parliament from Comilla-11.

Career
Bhuiyan was elected to Parliament in 2001 from Comilla-11 as a candidate of Bangladesh Nationalist Party. On 1 November 2006, his activists fought against his political rivals and burned down the home of Kamruzzaman, his rival. A local leader of Islami Chhatra Shibir, Mohammad Shahjahan, was killed in the fighting. Maulana SM Mohiuddin, the Amer of Nangalkot Upazila, filled a murder case over Shahjahans death against 51 including Bhuiyan. On 22 May 2007, he was detained on corruption charges. On 4 March 2007, he was sent to jail by a court. He was facing a number of charges including one for murder. On 16 December 2018, he was arrested from Bangladesh High Court area in Dhaka by Detective Branch of Bangladesh Police.

On 21 December 2008, Bangladesh Election Commission cancelled Bhuiyan candidacy after he filed with the commission twice, one as an independent candidate and again as a Bangladesh Nationalist Party candidate. The Election Commission had given the paddy leaf, symbol of Bangladesh Nationalist Party, to Mobasher Alam Bhuiyan, an independent candidate. It then took allocated the symbol of Gafur Bhuyian but withdrew its decision following a court verdict that asked the election commission to allocate the symbol to Mobasher.

References

Living people
Year of birth missing (living people)
People from Comilla District
Bangladesh Nationalist Party politicians
8th Jatiya Sangsad members